Lachesilla tanaidana is a species of Psocoptera from the Lachesillidae family that can be found in Germany, Hungary, Portugal, Sardinia, Switzerland, and Ukraine.

References

Lachesillidae
Insects described in 1953
Psocoptera of Europe